St. Paul's Episcopal Church is a Richardsonian Romanesque-styled church built in 1882 in Milwaukee, Wisconsin in the Episcopal Diocese of Milwaukee. Noted for its Tiffany windows, it is listed on the National Register of Historic Places and is a designated Milwaukee Landmark.

Description 

Founded in 1838, St. Paul's parish is the oldest Episcopal parish in Milwaukee and the third established in Wisconsin. It is located in the wealthy downtown east neighborhood of Juneautown. Members included many prominent citizens of the time, which helped the church to become the most influential Episcopal congregation in the state.

The building was designed by local architect Edward Townsend Mix in Romanesque Revival/Richardsonian Romanesque style and built in 1884 using Lake Superior Sandstone, a dark red sandstone found near the Apostle Islands in Lake Superior. It features wrought iron by Master Blacksmith Cyril Colnik.

St. Paul's Church also has the largest collection of Tiffany stained glass windows in the state. This includes the largest window ever made by Tiffany Studios of New York City. Spanning 30 feet long, 24 feet high and up to two inches thick, it is a copy of Gustave Doré's masterpiece "Christ Leaving the Praetorium."

It is believed that the building closely resembles one which was designed by architect Henry Hobson Richardson, whose plans were published in the Architectural Sketch Book in 1873, but never built.

A committee appointed by the church established Forest Home Cemetery on Milwaukee's south side, the final resting place of many of the city's famed beer barons and social elite. When the land was selected it was located nearly two miles outside of the city limits. At the time this was believed to be far enough from urban development to remain rural.

It was documented by the Historic American Buildings Survey in 1969 and was designated a Milwaukee Landmark in 1972.

See also
 Richard Thieme, priest at St. Paul's who went on to become an author and technology consultant.

References

External links 
 St. Paul's Episcopal Church
 A guide to Milwaukee's architectural landmarks
 St. Paul's Flower Festival
 Lake Superior Sandstone

Landmarks in Wisconsin
Churches on the National Register of Historic Places in Wisconsin
Churches in Milwaukee
Episcopal churches in Wisconsin
Religious organizations established in 1838
1838 establishments in Wisconsin Territory
National Register of Historic Places in Milwaukee